Rhittenia or Rhizenia was a town of ancient Crete. 

Its site is tentatively located near modern Kato Riza, Apesokari.

References

Populated places in ancient Crete
Former populated places in Greece
Cretan city-states